Ahmed Hassan Al-Derazi (born October 9, 1990) is a Bahraini professional basketball player for Al-Ahly club, and a former player for the Bahrain national team. He previously played for Muharraq Club of the Bahraini Premier League.

Early life
He practiced basketball from a young age. His club sports career started at the age of nine, when he joined the junior age groups at Muharraq Club and he progressed until he eventually reached the men’s category. He later won championships at Muharraq Club and also Al-Ahly club.

Awards

Local

2010–2011
Muharraq Club
Zain Cup Championship: 1st Golden Medal.

2012–2013
Muharraq Club
Super Cup Championship: MVP + 1st Golden Medal.
Zain Cup Championship: 1st Golden Medal.
Zain League Championship: MVP + 1st Golden Medal.

2014–2015
Muharraq Club
Zain Cup Championship: 1st Golden Medal.

2017–2018
Muharraq Club
Khalifa Bin Salman Cup Championship: Final MVP + Top scorer + 1st Golden Medal.

2018–2019
Muharraq Club
Zain League Championship: Guard of the year + Final MVP + 1st Golden Medal.

2019–2020
Muharraq Club
Super Cup Championship: 1st Golden Medal.

2020–2021
Al-Ahly club
Super Cup Championship: 1st Golden Medal.
Zain Cup Championship: 1st Golden Medal.
Khalifa Bin Salman Cup Championship: 1st Golden Medal.

2021–2022
Al-Ahly club
Super Cup Championship: 1st Golden Medal.
Zain League Championship: Bronze Medal.

International

2013
Muharraq Club
GCC  Basketball Clubs Championship: Bronze Medal.
Friendship & Peace Championship Al Qadisya Club Kuwait: MVP.

Bahrain national team
GCC National Teams Championship: Silver Medal.

2017
Bahrain national team
Arab Nationals Teams Championship – Egypt: Bronze Medal.

2021
Al-Ahly club
GCC  Basketball Clubs Championship: Bronze Medal.

Career statistics

References

External links
 FIBA Profile
 Asia-basket.com Profile
 Official website of the Bahrain Basketball Association
 Bahrain Basketball Association FIBA Profile
 Match Highlights 1
 Match Highlights 2
 Match Highlights 3

 

1990 births
Living people
Point guards
Bahraini men's basketball players